Binaware Williams Ajuwa (born 30 January 1982) is a Nigerian former professional footballer who played as a midfielder.

References

External links
 
 
 
 
 
 

Living people
1982 births
Association football midfielders
Nigerian footballers
Nigerian expatriate footballers
AS Dragons FC de l'Ouémé players
Celta de Vigo B players
S.L. Benfica B players
F.C. Felgueiras players
ES Viry-Châtillon players
Östersunds FK players
F.C. Vizela players
Sri Pahang FC players
FC Progresul București players
Liga I players
Binaware Williams Ajuwa
Expatriate footballers in Benin
Expatriate footballers in Spain
Expatriate footballers in Portugal
Expatriate footballers in France
Expatriate footballers in Sweden
Expatriate footballers in Malaysia
Expatriate footballers in Romania
Expatriate footballers in Thailand
Nigerian expatriate sportspeople in Benin
Nigerian expatriate sportspeople in Portugal
Nigerian expatriate sportspeople in France
Nigerian expatriate sportspeople in Sweden
Nigerian expatriate sportspeople in Malaysia
Nigerian expatriate sportspeople in Romania
Nigerian expatriate sportspeople in Thailand
Nigeria international footballers